Iziduko (pl.) in Xhosa are family names that are considered more important than surnames among Xhosa people. Many Xhosa persons can trace their family history back to a specific male ancestor or stock. Mentioning the clan name of someone is the highest form of respect, and it is considered polite to enquire after someone's clan name on meeting. The clan name is also sometimes used as an exclamation by members of that clan.

When a woman marries, she may take her husband's surname, but she always keeps her own clan name and adds the prefix "Ma-" to it. A man and a woman who have the same clan name may not marry, as they are considered to be related.

References

Sources
 Mlungisi Ndima (1988). A History of the Qwathi People from the Earliest Times to 1910. MA Thesis. Rhodes University.
 Kirsch et al. Clicking with Xhosa (2001). Cape Town: David Phillips Publishers. p. 22.
 Makuliwe, Mpumelelo T.A. Iziduko zabantu abathetha IsiXhosa: isikhokelo kwintetho yesintu.

Clan names